Uskedal or Uskedalen is a village in Kvinnherad municipality in Vestland county, Norway. The village is the site of Uskedalen Church.

Media gallery

References

Villages in Vestland
Kvinnherad